Ursula "Ursel" Brunner (born 30 January 1941) is a retired West German freestyle swimmer. She competed at the 1960 and 1964 Summer Olympics and won two bronze medals in relay events in 1960.

She won at least 15 national titles in the 100 m butterfly (1961–1962), 400 m individual medley (1962–1963), and 100 m (1959–1963) and 400 m freestyle (1957, 1959–1963). In 1963, she was selected the German Sportspersonality of the Year.

In 1975 Brunner married her former coach Hans Wirth (d. 1988). She has a son.

Publications

References

1941 births
Living people
German female swimmers
Olympic swimmers of the United Team of Germany
Olympic bronze medalists for the United Team of Germany
Olympic bronze medalists in swimming
Swimmers at the 1960 Summer Olympics
Swimmers at the 1964 Summer Olympics
Medalists at the 1960 Summer Olympics
Universiade medalists in swimming
Universiade gold medalists for West Germany
Universiade bronze medalists for West Germany
Medalists at the 1963 Summer Universiade